DNA mismatch repair protein Mlh3 is a protein that in humans is encoded by the MLH3 gene.

Function 

This gene is a member of the MutL-homolog (MLH) family of DNA mismatch repair (MMR) genes. MLH genes are implicated in maintaining genomic integrity during DNA replication and after meiotic recombination. The protein encoded by this gene functions as a heterodimer with other family members. Somatic mutations in this gene frequently occur in tumors exhibiting microsatellite instability, and germline mutations have been linked to hereditary nonpolyposis colorectal cancer type 7 (HNPCC7). Several alternatively spliced transcript variants have been identified, but the full-length nature of only two transcript variants has been determined. Orthologs of human MLH3 have also been studied in other organisms including mouse and the budding yeast Saccharomyces cerevisiae.

Meiosis
In addition to its role in DNA mismatch repair, MLH3 protein is also involved in meiotic crossing over.  MLH3 forms a heterodimer with MLH1 that appears to be necessary for mouse oocytes to progress through metaphase II of meiosis.

The MLH1-MLH3 heterodimers promote crossovers. Recombination during meiosis is often initiated by a DNA double-strand break (DSB) as illustrated in the accompanying diagram. During recombination, sections of DNA at the 5' ends of the break are cut away in a process called resection. In the strand invasion step that follows, an overhanging 3' end of the broken DNA molecule then "invades" the DNA of a homologous chromosome that is not broken forming a displacement loop (D-loop). After strand invasion, the further sequence of events may follow either of two main pathways leading to a crossover (CO) or a non-crossover (NCO) recombinant (see Genetic recombination.  The pathway leading to a CO involves a double Holliday junction (DHJ) intermediate. Holliday junctions need to be resolved for CO recombination to be completed.

In the budding yeast Saccharomyces cerevisiae, as in the mouse, MLH3 forms a heterodimer with MLH1.  Meiotic CO requires resolution of Holliday junctions through actions of the MLH1-MLH3 heterodimer.  The MLH1-MLH3 heterodimer is an endonuclease that makes single-strand breaks in supercoiled double-stranded DNA.  MLH1-MLH3 binds specifically to Holliday junctions and may act as part of a larger complex to process Holliday junctions during meiosis.  MLH1-MLH3 heterodimer (MutL gamma) together with Exo1 and Sgs1 (ortholog of Bloom syndrome helicase) define a joint molecule resolution pathway that produces the majority of crossovers in budding yeast and, by inference, in mammals.

Interactions 

MLH3 has been shown to interact with MSH4.

References

Further reading